America by The Numbers with Maria Hinojosa: Clarkston Georgia is a half-hour television program, airing as a Need to Know Election 2012 special on PBS. It premiered on September 21, 2012.

Production
America by The Numbers with Maria Hinojosa: Clarkston Georgia is produced by The Futuro Media Group and hosted by Maria Hinojosa. It is the first full-length television program to be produced by The Futuro Media Group and the first public affairs program on PBS to be both executive produced and anchored by a Latina woman.

Produced with the support of:
 The National Minority Consortia
 Ford Foundation 
 Marguerite Casey Foundation

Content
America By The Numbers with Maria Hinojosa: Clarkston Georgia is the story of a small town of 7,500 people that has gone from being 90% white in the 1980s to less than 14% white today. Located in the shadow of Stone Mountain, once a gathering place for Ku Klux Klan cross burnings, today Clarkston, Georgia is home to thousands of refugees from Vietnam, Somalia, Iraq and Bhutan – along with some 40 other countries. The program is a look at one of the most diverse communities in America and how changing demographics are reshaping the political landscape in America.

Critical reception
Early critical reception has been positive. Esther Cepeda of The Holland Sentinel states that the program is "simply an example of how diversity truly plays a leading role in helping the melting pot make new Americans out of recent arrivals. It's also a celebration of an America where a Hispanic journalist can skillfully illuminate the experiences of a unique group of recent immigrants and their nervous neighbors without ever having to utter a word of Spanish."

References

External links
PBS Need to Know Schedule
Sneak Peak of America By the Numbers

PBS original programming
2012 American television series debuts
English-language television shows